Mari Manoogian (born September 3, 1992) is an American politician from Michigan who represents the 40th District in the Michigan House of Representatives. A member of the Democratic Party, her constituency includes several communities within Oakland County, including Birmingham, Bloomfield Hills, Bloomfield Township, and part of West Bloomfield Township.

Early life and education 
Manoogian was born in Birmingham, Michigan as the eldest daughter of a utility worker and union leader, and a vocational rehabilitation specialist. After graduating from Ernest W. Seaholm High School in 2010, Manoogian began her undergraduate work at Michigan State University's James Madison College. She moved to Washington, D.C. in 2012, and finished her bachelor's degree in international relations and security policy at George Washington University's Elliott School of International Affairs in 2014, and earned a master's degree in global communication and international organizations from the same institution in 2017.

Manoogian's family are descendants of survivors of the Armenian genocide. She is a member of St. Sarkis Armenian Apostolic Church in Dearborn.

Career 
During her undergraduate studies, Manoogian interned in the office of Congressman John Dingell and at the United States Mission to the United Nations under Ambassador Samantha Power. She began work in Washington, D.C. at the United States Department of State, first in the Office of English Language Programs and later in the Office of eDiplomacy, before returning to Michigan and running for office.

Manoogian began campaigning for election to the Michigan House of Representatives in August 2017. Receiving the endorsement of national progressive candidate recruitment organization Run for Something, Manoogian won the Democratic primary in August 2018, defeating the 2016 Democratic nominee for the 40th District, Nicole Bedi. During the general election, Manoogian was endorsed by former U.S. President Barack Obama and former 2016 U.S. Presidential Candidate Hillary Clinton. Manoogian defeated David Wolkinson – former vice chairman of the Michigan Republican Party and policy director to Governor Rick Snyder – by 56.5% to 43.4%, flipping the district for the first time in 22 years.

Manoogian was selected as one of seventeen speakers to jointly deliver the keynote address at the 2020 Democratic National Convention nominating Joe Biden and Kamala Harris.

Political positions 
Manoogian supports repealing the state Senior Pension Tax and expanding investment in renewable energy practices. She has been profiled by national and local news outlets in the lead-up to her election for supporting funding for clean water initiatives in her district. She considers herself a progressive.

Campaigns

2020

2018

References 

Democratic Party members of the Michigan House of Representatives
1992 births
21st-century American women politicians
American people of Armenian descent
Elliott School of International Affairs alumni
Ethnic Armenian politicians
Living people
People from Birmingham, Michigan
Women state legislators in Michigan
21st-century American politicians